Galgagnano is a comune (municipality) in the Province of Lodi in the Italian region Lombardy, located about  southeast of Milan and about  southeast of Lodi.

Galgagnano borders the following municipalities: Zelo Buon Persico, Mulazzano, Cervignano d'Adda, Boffalora d'Adda, Montanaso Lombardo.

References

External links
 Official website

Cities and towns in Lombardy